Lee Martin may refer to:

Lee Martin (footballer, born February 1968), former Manchester United footballer and scorer of the winning goal in the 1990 FA Cup final replay
Lee Martin (footballer, born September 1968), former Huddersfield Town and Rochdale football goalkeeper
Lee Martin (footballer, born 1987), English footballer for Exeter City
Lee Martin (writer), American author
Lee Martin (mystery writer), pseudonym of Anne Wingate
Lee Martin (politician) (1870–1950), New Zealand politician
Lee Ann Martin, judge in Manitoba, Canada
Lee Roy Martin (1937–1972), American serial killer